Mervinslaw Pele, also known as Mervinslaw Tower, is a 16th-century castle in the Scottish Borders. It is mostly intact except for its roof.

It is two storeys tall, plus a garret. There are no stairs, and access was thought to be via ladders. There is no fireplace, but there is evidence of a hearth. There is evidence of other buildings existing nearby.

It belonged to the Olivers.

See also
Peel tower

References

Further reading

External links 
Mervinslaw Pele-house Canmore entry
Mervinslaw Pele-house | ScotlandsPlaces

Towers completed in the 16th century
Castles in the Scottish Borders
Listed castles in Scotland
Peel towers in the Scottish Borders
Category A listed buildings in the Scottish Borders
Scheduled monuments in Scotland